ν Microscopii, Latinized as Nu Microscopii, is a star in the constellation Microscopium. It is an orange hued star that is visible to the naked eye as a faint point of light with an apparent visual magnitude of 4.76. It was first catalogued as Nu Indi by the French explorer and astronomer Nicolas Louis de Lacaille in 1756, before being reclassified in Microscopium and given its current Bayer designation of Nu Microscopii by Gould. The object is located at a distance of around 252 light-years from the Sun, based on parallax, and is drifting further away with a radial velocity of about +9 km/s.

It is an aging giant star with a stellar classification of K0 III. It has expanded to 10.6 times the girth of the Sun after exhausting the supply of hydrogen at its core and evolving off the main sequence. The star has 2.46 times the mass of the Sun. It is radiating 59.5 times the Sun's luminosity from its swollen photosphere at an effective temperature of 4,925 K.

References

K-type giants
Microscopium
Microscopii, Nu
Durchmusterung objects
195569
101477
7846